Peter Moon (born 18 January 1953) is an Australian comedian, best known for writing and performing in the sketch comedy Fast Forward.

Biography 
Moon was born in Yarram, Victoria.

On Fast Forward, his characters were often oafish sidekicks to more dominant characters played by Steve Vizard, including Barry the advertising executive and Abdul the Persian carpet salesman. Moon appeared in one of the show's best-known parodies, of the Kung Fu television series (also opposite Vizard), and as the "very unattractive"  Soviet newsreader Victor with Jane Turner as Svetta.

After Fast Forward, Moon worked as a writer and occasional guest performer on its successor, Full Frontal, and various other comedy series, usually alongside other Fast Forward alumni. In 1995 Moon joined the 2Day FM Morning Crew breakfast radio show, co-hosting alongside Wendy Harmer.  For 8 years this was consistently the highest rating FM Breakfast show in Sydney, until animosity between the two hosts, together with Moon increasingly delivering his content for the show from a studio in Melbourne, led to him being axed in 2002. The new duo of Greg Fleet and Harmer rated poorly and Morning Crew was taken off air at the end of the following year.

Moon also played Samuel Marsden in the historical sit-com Bligh, and appeared in Bill Bennett's Film The Nugget. Since then Moon has been developing film and television projects and making occasional appearances in shows such as 20 to 1 and Let Loose Live. He recently wrote, produced and appeared in The Comedy Channel's sitcom Whatever Happened To That Guy?, which is loosely based on his post-fame life. He is also the treasurer of the Australian Writers Guild.

He has three children.

In 2010, Moon joined the cast of Neighbours on a recurring basis as theatre producer Terry Kearney.

Select credits
Snow: The Movie (1982)

References

External links
 

Living people
Australian male comedians
Australian comedy writers
Australian male television actors
1953 births